Pukete is a 1970s riverside suburb in northwestern Hamilton in New Zealand. 

The cobblestoned walk in the park has a grass dog exercise area. The riverside walkway, which includes many pedestrian bridges, can be used by walkers or cyclists, but the lower sections are subject to flooding in winter. A pedestrian bridge links Braithwaite Park to Flagstaff on the eastern side of the Waikato River. A 2015 River Plan proposed it become 'a flower garden bridge'.

There is a small beach on the west side of the river at Braithwaite park often used in summer by water skiers and picnickers. To the north of the residential area is the Pukete Mountain Bike track, an Equestrian centre, and a two-lane launching ramp into the Waikato River, all on the Pukete Farm Park. A concreted riverside track, for bikes and pedestrians, runs north from Mountain View Lane starting by the southeast side of the Fonterra Te Rapa Milk powder factory.

The eastern part of Pukete and neighbouring St Andrews is built on an old river terrace. This rises to the flat alluvial fan that covers most of Hamilton. The land rises to one of Hamilton's many small hills at Ngaio Place giving views over most of Hamilton.

Four-laning of the Pukete Bridge was completed in Easter 2013, well ahead of schedule due to the long dry summer.

Demographics 

Pukete had a population of 4,605 at the 2018 New Zealand census, an increase of 309 people (7.2%) since the 2013 census, and an increase of 108 people (2.4%) since the 2006 census. There were 1,539 households, comprising 2,298 males and 2,307 females, giving a sex ratio of 1.0 males per female, with 1,071 people (23.3%) aged under 15 years, 975 (21.2%) aged 15 to 29, 2,082 (45.2%) aged 30 to 64, and 477 (10.4%) aged 65 or older.

Ethnicities were 77.4% European/Pākehā, 19.6% Māori, 4.9% Pacific peoples, 10.7% Asian, and 2.3% other ethnicities. People may identify with more than one ethnicity.

The percentage of people born overseas was 20.2, compared with 27.1% nationally.

Although some people chose not to answer the census's question about religious affiliation, 54.7% had no religion, 32.9% were Christian, 0.9% had Māori religious beliefs, 2.2% were Hindu, 0.4% were Muslim, 0.7% were Buddhist and 1.9% had other religions.

Of those at least 15 years old, 753 (21.3%) people had a bachelor's or higher degree, and 549 (15.5%) people had no formal qualifications. 681 people (19.3%) earned over $70,000 compared to 17.2% nationally. The employment status of those at least 15 was that 2,043 (57.8%) people were employed full-time, 477 (13.5%) were part-time, and 159 (4.5%) were unemployed.

Individual census areas
Pukete includes two census areas, East and West. The population is stable and they are wealthier and younger than the 37.4 years of the national average, as shown below -

In 2018 the main ethnic groups were -

History 
Pukete Pa is located in the north of the suburb on a cliff on the Waikato River bank, at the northern end of the riverside Braithwate Park. It is thought to have been built by Nga Iwi and later conquered by Ngati Koura The name Pukete comes from a locally made bag used to soak hinau berries in streams to ferment and preserve them. The area was confiscated in 1864, after the invasion of the Waikato. A double ditch remains to the north of the Pa. Carved wooden items, found close to the pā, are in Waikato Museum. Habitation was sparse, as one early European traveller noted no other settlement for  along the Waikato.

Pukete parish existed from at least 1867, but, until the 1900s, Horotiu was often referred to as Pukete. Horotiu railway station changed its name from Pukete on 23 June 1907, when the proposed post office was referred to as Horotiu (Pukete), and the name of Horotiu school changed from Pukete in 1911.

Pukete and neighbouring Te Rapa were important sites for the kauri gum trade of the late 19th/early 20th centuries, being some of the southern-most locations where gum could be found.

In 2011 Hamilton Libraries compiled a list of street names, showing that most development occurred over about a decade from 1969, that many roads were named after trees and several developers were involved Before long, Pukete School was opened in 1972 and a swimming pool in 1975. Rather slower to open were a library in 1999 and Te Manawa Hall in 2002.

Braithwaite Park 
Braithwaite Park was owned by Waikato Hospital Board, who sold it to developers in 1990, the park being transferred to Hamilton City Council on 12 June 1990. It has a jetty, which is the terminus of a ferry to Hamilton.

Education
The current school opened in 1973.

Te Rapa School also serves the area.

See also 

List of streets in Hamilton
Suburbs of Hamilton, New Zealand
The Base (shopping centre)
Pukete sewage works
Te Rapa railway station

References

Suburbs of Hamilton, New Zealand
Populated places on the Waikato River